Alicia L. Hyndman is the Assembly member for the 29th District of the New York State Assembly. She is a Democrat. The district includes portions of Laurelton, Rosedale, St. Albans, Addisleigh Park, Hollis, Springfield Gardens and Jamaica in Queens.

Life and career
Hyndman was born in London, England to parents who had immigrated from the Caribbean, and moved at a very young age to New York City, where her parents settled in the Queens neighborhoods of Hollis, and subsequently South Ozone Park.  She would attend public schools, graduating from John Adams High School.

She received a Bachelor of Arts degree from SUNY New Paltz and later a Master of Public Administration from Framingham State College in Massachusetts. She worked in education policy at the New York State Department of Education, Brooklyn College, and the New York College of Osteopathic Medicine.

Hyndman served as President of the Community District Education Council 29 - a group of volunteer parents that advise the NYC School Chancellor on dozens of schools in Southeast Queens. As President of CDEC 29, she organized opposition to co-location proposals throughout her school district including I.S.59Q and P.S.15Q Under her leadership, CDEC 29 also voted to approve 'middle school choice' which allows parents in the school district to select from any middle school in their area. She also helped to lobby for the construction of a new school in the heart of St. Albans after a local Catholic school closed.

Hyndman resides in Rosedale, Queens with her two daughters.

New York Assembly
In 2015, Assemblyman William Scarborough was convicted of a felony for the inappropriate use of state funds, and as a result was forced to relinquish his seat in the Assembly. With a special election called, Hyndman was nominated by the Queens Democratic Party to replace him. Facing nominal opposition, Hyndman went on to win the seat on November 3, 2015 with 91.35% of the vote.

References

External links
New York State Assemblywoman Alicia Hyndman official site

African-American state legislators in New York (state)
African-American women in politics
21st-century American politicians
21st-century American women politicians
Living people
English emigrants to the United States
Framingham State University alumni
Democratic Party members of the New York State Assembly
Candidates in the 2021 United States elections
People from Hollis, Queens
People from Ozone Park, Queens
People from Rosedale, Queens
Politicians from London
State University of New York at New Paltz alumni
Women state legislators in New York (state)
1971 births
21st-century African-American women
21st-century African-American politicians
20th-century African-American people
20th-century African-American women